Sawblade EP may refer to
          
Sawblade (Isis EP)
Sawblade (Gangrene EP)